Climate sensitivity is a measure of how much Earth's surface will cool or warm after a specified factor causes a change in its climate system, such as how much it will warm for a doubling in the atmospheric carbon dioxide concentration. In technical terms, climate sensitivity is the average change in global mean surface temperature in response to a radiative forcing, which drives a difference between Earth's incoming and outgoing energy. Climate sensitivity is a key measure in climate science, and a focus area for climate scientists, who want to understand the ultimate consequences of anthropogenic global warming.

The Earth's surface warms as a direct consequence of increased atmospheric , as well as increased concentrations of other greenhouse gases such as nitrous oxide and methane. The increasing temperatures have secondary effects on the climate system, such as an increase in atmospheric water vapour, which is itself also a greenhouse gas. Scientists do not know exactly how strong the climate feedbacks are and it is difficult to predict the precise amount of warming that will result from a given increase in greenhouse gas concentrations. If climate sensitivity turns out to be on the high side of scientific estimates, the Paris Agreement goal of limiting global warming to below  will be difficult to achieve.

The two primary types of climate sensitivity are the shorter-term "transient climate response", the increase in global average temperature that is expected to have occurred at a time when the atmospheric  concentration has doubled, and "equilibrium climate sensitivity", the higher long-term increase in global average temperature expected to occur after the effects of a doubled  concentration have had time to reach a steady state. Climate sensitivity is typically estimated in three ways: using direct observations of temperature and levels of greenhouse gases taken during the industrial age, using indirectly-estimated temperature and other measurements from the Earth's more distant past, and computer modelling the various aspects of the climate system with computers.

Background 
The rate at which energy reaches Earth as sunlight and leaves Earth as heat radiation to space must balance, or the total amount of heat energy on the planet at any one time will rise or fall, which results in a planet that is warmer or cooler overall. A driver of an imbalance between the rates of incoming and outgoing radiation energy is called radiative forcing. A warmer planet radiates heat to space faster and so a new balance is eventually reached, with a higher temperature and stored energy content. However, the warming of the planet also has knock-on effects, which create further warming in an exacerbating feedback loop. Climate sensitivity is a measure of how much temperature change a given amount of radiative forcing will cause.  The conceptual framework is similar to that applied to evaluating the influences of economic externalities.

Radiative forcing 

Radiative forcings are generally quantified as Watts per square meter (W/m2) and averaged over Earth's uppermost surface defined as the top of the atmosphere.  The magnitude of a forcing is specific to the physical driver and is defined relative to an accompanying time span of interest for its application.  In the context of a contribution to long-term climate sensitivity from 1750 to 2020, the 50% increase in atmospheric  is characterized by a forcing of about +2.1 W/m2.   In the context of shorter-term contributions to Earth's energy imbalance (i.e. its heating/cooling rate), time intervals of interest may be as short as the interval between measurement or simulation data samplings, and are thus likely to be accompanied by smaller forcing values.  Forcings from such investigations have also been analyzed and reported at decadal time scales.

Radiative forcing leads to long-term changes in global temperature. A number of factors contribute radiative forcing: increased downwelling radiation from the greenhouse effect, variability in solar radiation from changes in planetary orbit, changes in solar irradiance, direct and indirect effects caused by aerosols (for example changes in albedo from cloud cover), and changes in land use (deforestation or the loss of reflective ice cover). In contemporary research, radiative forcing by greenhouse gases is well understood. , large uncertainties remain for aerosols.

Key numbers
Carbon dioxide levels rose from 280 parts per million (ppm) in the 18th century, when humans in the Industrial Revolution started burning significant amounts of fossil fuel such as coal, to over 415 ppm by 2020. As  is a greenhouse gas, it hinders heat energy from leaving the Earth's atmosphere. In 2016, atmospheric  levels had increased by 45% over preindustrial levels, and radiative forcing caused by increased  was already more than 50% higher than in pre-industrial times because of non-linear effects. Between the 18th-century start of the Industrial Revolution and the year 2020, the Earth's temperature rose by a little over one degree Celsius (about two degrees Fahrenheit).

Societal importance 
Because the economics of climate change mitigation depend greatly on how quickly carbon neutrality needs to be achieved, climate sensitivity estimates can have important economic and policy-making implications. One study suggests that halving the uncertainty of the value for transient climate response (TCR) could save trillions of dollars. Scientists are uncertain about the precision of estimates of greenhouse gas increases on future temperature since a higher climate sensitivity would mean more dramatic increases in temperature, which makes it more prudent to take significant climate action. If climate sensitivity turns out to be on the high end of what scientists estimate, the Paris Agreement goal of limiting global warming to well below 2 °C cannot be achieved, and temperature increases will exceed that limit, at least temporarily. The more sensitive the climate system is to changes in greenhouse gas concentrations, the more likely it is to have decades when temperatures are much higher or much lower than the longer-term average.

Contributors 
Radiative forcing is one component of climate change. The radiative forcing caused by a doubling of atmospheric  levels (from the pre-industrial 280 ppm) is approximately 3.7 watts per square meter (W/m2). That figure is straightforward to calculate by using the Stefan–Boltzmann law and is undisputed.

A further contribution arises from climate feedback, both exacerbating and suppressing. The uncertainty in climate sensitivity estimates is entirely from the modelling of feedbacks in the climate system, including water vapour feedback, ice–albedo feedback, cloud feedback, and lapse rate feedback.  Suppressing feedbacks tend to counteract warming by increasing the rate at which energy is radiated to space from a warmer planet. Exacerbating feedbacks increase warming; for example, higher temperatures can cause ice to melt, which reduces the ice area and the amount of sunlight the ice reflects, which in turn results in less heat energy being radiated back into space. Climate sensitivity depends on the balance between those feedbacks.

Measures
Depending on the time scale, there are two main ways to define climate sensitivity: the short-term transient climate response (TCR) and the long-term equilibrium climate sensitivity (ECS), both of which  incorporate the warming from exacerbating feedback loops. They are not discrete categories, but they overlap. Sensitivity to atmospheric  increases is measured in the amount of temperature change for doubling in the atmospheric  concentration.

Although the term "climate sensitivity" is usually used for the sensitivity to radiative forcing caused by rising atmospheric , it is a general property of the climate system. Other agents can also cause a radiative imbalance. Climate sensitivity is the change in surface air temperature per unit change in radiative forcing, and the climate sensitivity parameter is therefore expressed in units of °C/(W/m2). Climate sensitivity is approximately the same whatever the reason for the radiative forcing (such as from greenhouse gases or solar variation). When climate sensitivity is expressed as the temperature change for a level of atmospheric  double the pre-industrial level, its units are degrees Celsius (°C).

Transient climate response 
The transient climate response (TCR) is defined as "is the change in the global mean surface temperature, averaged over a 20-year period, centered at the time of atmospheric carbon dioxide doubling, in a climate model simulation" in which the atmospheric  concentration increases at 1% per year. That estimate is generated by using shorter-term simulations. The transient response is lower than the equilibrium climate sensitivity because slower feedbacks, which exacerbate the temperature increase, take more time to respond in full to an increase in the atmospheric  concentration. For instance, the deep ocean takes many centuries to reach a new steady state after a perturbation during which it continues to serve as heatsink, which cools the upper ocean.

A related measure is the transient climate response to cumulative carbon emissions (TCRE), which is the globally averaged surface temperature change after 1000 GtC of  has been emitted. As such, it includes not only temperature feedbacks to forcing but also the carbon cycle and carbon cycle feedbacks.

Equilibrium climate sensitivity 
The equilibrium climate sensitivity (ECS) is the long-term temperature rise (equilibrium global mean near-surface air temperature) that is expected to result from a doubling of the atmospheric  concentration (ΔT2×). It is a prediction of the new global mean near-surface air temperature once the  concentration has stopped increasing, and most of the feedbacks have had time to have their full effect. Reaching an equilibrium temperature can take centuries or even millennia after  has doubled. ECS is higher than TCR because of the oceans' short-term buffering effects. Computer models are used for estimating the ECS. A comprehensive estimate means that modelling the whole time span during which significant feedbacks continue to change global temperatures in the model, such as fully-equilibrating ocean temperatures, requires running a computer model that covers thousands of years. There are, however, less computing-intensive methods.

The IPCC Sixth Assessment Report (AR6) stated that there is high confidence that ECS is within the range of 2.5 °C to 4 °C, with a best estimate of 3 °C.

The long time scales involved with ECS make it arguably a less relevant measure for policy decisions around climate change.

Effective climate sensitivity
A common approximation to ECS is the effective equilibrium climate sensitivity, is an estimate of equilibrium climate sensitivity by using data from a climate system in model or real-world observations that is not yet in equilibrium. Estimates assume that the net amplification effect of feedbacks, as measured after some period of warming, will remain constant afterwards. That is not necessarily true, as feedbacks can change with time. In many climate models, feedbacks become stronger over time and so the effective climate sensitivity is lower than the real ECS.

Earth system sensitivity
By definition, equilibrium climate sensitivity does not include feedbacks that take millennia to emerge, such as long-term changes in Earth's albedo because of changes in ice sheets and vegetation. It includes the slow response of the deep oceans' warming, which also takes millennia, and so ECS fails to reflect the actual future warming that would occur if  is stabilized at double pre-industrial values. Earth system sensitivity (ESS) incorporates the effects of these slower feedback loops, such as the change in Earth's albedo from the melting of large continental ice sheets, which covered much of the Northern Hemisphere during the Last Glacial Maximum and still cover Greenland and Antarctica). Changes in albedo as a result of changes in vegetation, as well as changes in ocean circulation, are also included. The longer-term feedback loops make the ESS larger than the ECS, possibly twice as large. Data from the geological history of Earth is used in estimating ESS. Differences between modern and long-ago climatic conditions mean that estimates of the future ESS are highly uncertain. Like for the ECS and the TCR, the carbon cycle is not included in the definition of the ESS, but all other elements of the climate system are included.

Sensitivity to nature of forcing
Different forcing agents, such as greenhouse gases and aerosols, can be compared using their radiative forcing, the initial radiative imbalance averaged over the entire globe. Climate sensitivity is the amount of warming per radiative forcing. To a first approximation, the cause of the radiative imbalance does not matter whether it is greenhouse gases or something else. The amount of feedback varies mainly because the forcings are not uniformly distributed over the globe. That is because those regions have more self-reinforcing feedbacks, such as the ice–albedo feedback. When climate sensitivity to  forcing is estimated by using historical temperature and forcing (caused by a mix of aerosols and greenhouse gases), and that effect is not taken into account, climate sensitivity is underestimated.

State dependence 

For instance, the planet has polar ice and high-altitude glaciers. Until the world's ice has completely melted, an exacerbating ice–albedo feedback loop makes the system more sensitive overall. Throughout Earth's history, multiple periods are thought to have snow and ice cover almost the entire globe. In most models of "Snowball Earth,", parts of the tropics were at least intermittently free of ice cover. As the ice advanced or retreated, climate sensitivity must have been very high, as the large changes in area of ice cover would have made for a very strong ice–albedo feedback. Volcanic atmospheric composition changes are thought to have provided the radiative forcing needed to escape the snowball state.

Throughout the Quaternary period (the most recent 2.58 million years), climate has oscillated between glacial periods, the most recent one being the Last Glacial Maximum, and interglacial periods, the most recent one being the current Holocene, but the period's climate sensitivity is difficult to determine. The Paleocene–Eocene Thermal Maximum, about 55.5 million years ago, was unusually warm and may have been characterized by above-average climate sensitivity.

Climate sensitivity may further change if tipping points are crossed. It is unlikely that tipping points will cause short-term changes in climate sensitivity. If a tipping point is crossed, climate sensitivity is expected to change at the time scale of the subsystem that hits its tipping point. Especially if there are multiple interacting tipping points, the transition of climate to a new state may be difficult to reverse.

The two most common definitions of climate sensitivity specify the climate state: the ECS and the TCR are defined for a doubling with respect to the  levels in the pre-industrial era. The effect of any change in climate sensitivity is expected to be small or negligible in the first century after additional  is released into the atmosphere.

Estimates

Historical estimates 
To account for water vapour feedback, he assumed that relative humidity would stay the same under global warming.

The first calculation of climate sensitivity that used detailed measurements of absorption spectra, as well as the first calculation to use a computer for numerical integration of the radiative transfer through the atmosphere, was performed by Syukuro Manabe and Richard Wetherald in 1967. The work has been called "arguably the greatest climate-science paper of all time" and "the most influential study of climate of all time."

A committee on anthropogenic global warming, convened in 1979 by the United States National Academy of Sciences and chaired by Jule Charney, estimated equilibrium climate sensitivity to be , plus or minus . According to Manabe, speaking in 2004, "Charney chose 0.5 °C as a reasonable margin of error, subtracted it from Manabe's number, and added it to Hansen's, giving rise to the  range of likely climate sensitivity that has appeared in every greenhouse assessment since ...." In 2008, climatologist Stefan Rahmstorf said: "At that time [it was published], the [Charney report estimate's] range [of uncertainty] was on very shaky ground. Since then, many vastly improved models have been developed by a number of climate research centers around the world."

Intergovernmental Panel on Climate Change

Despite considerable progress in the understanding of Earth's climate system, assessments continued to report similar uncertainty ranges for climate sensitivity for some time after the 1979 Charney report. The report used models with simplified representations of ocean dynamics. The IPCC supplementary report, 1992, which used full-ocean circulation models, saw "no compelling reason to warrant changing" the 1990 estimate; and the IPCC Second Assessment Report stated, "No strong reasons have emerged to change [these estimates]," In the reports, much of the uncertainty around climate sensitivity was attributed to insufficient knowledge of cloud processes. The 2001 IPCC Third Assessment Report also retained this likely range.

Authors of the 2007 IPCC Fourth Assessment Report stated that confidence in estimates of equilibrium climate sensitivity had increased substantially since the Third Annual Report.

(See the next section for details.) Those values were estimated by combining the available data with expert judgement.

When the IPCC began to produce its IPCC Sixth Assessment Report, many climate models began to show a higher climate sensitivity. The estimates for Equilibrium Climate Sensitivity changed from 3.2 °C to 3.7 °C and the estimates for the Transient climate response from 1.8 °C, to 2.0 °C. That is probably because of better understanding of the role of clouds and aerosols.

Methods of estimation

Using Industrial Age (1750–present) data 
Climate sensitivity can be estimated using the observed temperature increase, the observed ocean heat uptake, and the modelled or observed radiative forcing. The data are linked through a simple energy-balance model to calculate climate sensitivity. Radiative forcing is often modelled because Earth observation satellites measuring it has existed during only part of the Industrial Age (only since the mid-20th century).

Estimates of transient climate response (TCR) that have been calculated from models and observational data can be reconciled if it is taken into account that fewer temperature measurements are taken in the polar regions, which warm more quickly than the Earth as a whole. If only regions for which measurements are available are used in evaluating the model, the differences in TCR estimates are negligible.

A very simple climate model could estimate climate sensitivity from Industrial Age data by waiting for the climate system to reach equilibrium and then by measuring the resulting warming,  (°C). Computation of the equilibrium climate sensitivity, S (°C), using the radiative forcing  (W/m2) and the measured temperature rise, would then be possible. Combining that information results in this equation:

.

However, the climate system is not in equilibrium since the actual warming lags the equilibrium warming, largely because the oceans take up heat and will take centuries or millennia to reach equilibrium. Estimating climate sensitivity from Industrial Age data requires an adjustment to the equation above. The actual forcing felt by the atmosphere is the radiative forcing minus the ocean's heat uptake,  (W/m2) and so climate sensitivity can be estimated:

The climate forcing, also contains contributions from solar activity (+0.05 W/m2), aerosols (−0.9 W/m2), ozone (+0.35 W/m2), and other smaller influences, which brings the total forcing over the Industrial Period to 2.2 W/m2, according to the best estimate of the IPCC AR5, with substantial uncertainty.

Other strategies
In theory, Industrial Age temperatures could also be used to determine a time scale for the temperature response of the climate system and thus climate sensitivity: if the effective heat capacity of the climate system is known, and the timescale is estimated using autocorrelation of the measured temperature, an estimate of climate sensitivity can be derived. In practice, however, the simultaneous determination of the time scale and heat capacity is difficult.

Attempts have been made to use the 11-year solar cycle to constrain the transient climate response. Solar irradiance is about 0.9 W/m2 higher during a solar maximum than during a solar minimum, and those effect can be observed in measured average global temperatures from 1959 to 2004. Unfortunately, the solar minima in the period coincided with volcanic eruptions, which have a cooling effect on the global temperature. Because the eruptions caused a larger and less well-quantified decrease in radiative forcing than the reduced solar irradiance, it is questionable whether useful quantitative conclusions can be derived from the observed temperature variations.

Observations of volcanic eruptions have also been used to try to estimate climate sensitivity, but as the aerosols from a single eruption last at most a couple of years in the atmosphere, the climate system can never come close to equilibrium, and there is less cooling than there would be if the aerosols stayed in the atmosphere for longer. Therefore, volcanic eruptions give information only about a lower bound on transient climate sensitivity.

Using data from Earth's past 
Historical climate sensitivity can be estimated by using reconstructions of Earth's past temperatures and  levels. Paleoclimatologists have studied different geological periods, such as the warm Pliocene (5.3 to 2.6 million years ago) and the colder Pleistocene (2.6 million to 11,700 years ago), and sought periods that are in some way analogous to or informative about current climate change. Climates further back in Earth's history are more difficult to study because fewer data are available about them. For instance, past  concentrations can be derived from air trapped in ice cores, but , the oldest continuous ice core is less than one million years old. Recent periods, such as the Last Glacial Maximum (LGM) (about 21,000 years ago) and the Mid-Holocene (about 6,000 years ago), are often studied, especially when more information about them becomes available.

A 2007 estimate of sensitivity made using data from the most recent 420 million years is consistent with sensitivities of current climate models and with other determinations. Studies of the last 800,000 years have concluded that climate sensitivity was greater in glacial periods than in interglacial periods.

As the name suggests, the Last Glacial Maximum was much colder than today, and good data on atmospheric  concentrations and radiative forcing from that period are available. The period's orbital forcing was different from today's but had little effect on mean annual temperatures. Estimating climate sensitivity from the Last Glacial Maximum can be done by several different ways. One way is to use estimates of global radiative forcing and temperature directly. In a different approach, a model of intermediate complexity is used to simulate conditions during the period. Several versions of this single model are run, with different values chosen for uncertain parameters, such that each version has a different ECS. Outcomes that best simulate the LGM's observed cooling probably produce the most realistic ECS values.

Using climate models 

Climate models simulate the -driven warming of the future as well as the past. They operate on principles similar to those underlying models that predict the weather, but they focus on longer-term processes. Climate models typically begin with a starting state and then apply physical laws and knowledge about biology to generate subsequent states. As with weather modelling, no computer has the power to model the complexity of the entire planet and so simplifications are used to reduce that complexity to something manageable. An important simplification divides Earth's atmosphere into model cells. For instance, the atmosphere might be divided into cubes of air ten or one hundred kilometers on a side. Each model cell is treated as if it were homogeneous. Calculations for model cells are much faster than trying to simulate each molecule of air separately.

A lower model resolution (large model cells and long time steps) takes less computing power but cannot simulate the atmosphere in as much detail. A model cannot simulate processes smaller than the model cells or shorter-term than a single time step. The effects of the smaller-scale and shorter-term processes must therefore be estimated by using other methods. Physical laws contained in the models may also be simplified to speed up calculations. The biosphere must be included in climate models. The effects of the biosphere are estimated by using data on the average behaviour of the average plant assemblage of an area under the modelled conditions. Climate sensitivity is therefore an emergent property of these models. It is not prescribed, but it follows from the interaction of all the modelled processes.

To estimate climate sensitivity, a model is run by using a variety of radiative forcings (doubling quickly, doubling gradually, or following historical emissions) and the temperature results are compared to the forcing applied. Different models give different estimates of climate sensitivity, but they tend to fall within a similar range, as described above.

Testing, comparisons, and estimates 
Modelling of the climate system can lead to a wide range of outcomes. Models are often run that use different plausible parameters in their approximation of physical laws and the behaviour of the biosphere, which forms a perturbed physics ensemble, which attempts to model the sensitivity of the climate to different types and amounts of change in each parameter. Alternatively, structurally-different models developed at different institutions are put together, creating an ensemble. By selecting only the simulations that can simulate some part of the historical climate well, a constrained estimate of climate sensitivity can be made. One strategy for obtaining more accurate results is placing more emphasis on climate models that perform well in general.

A model is tested using observations, paleoclimate data, or both to see if it replicates them accurately. If it does not, inaccuracies in the physical model and parametrizations are sought, and the model is modified. For models used to estimate climate sensitivity, specific test metrics that are directly and physically linked to climate sensitivity are sought. Examples of such metrics are the global patterns of warming, the ability of a model to reproduce observed relative humidity in the tropics and subtropics, patterns of heat radiation, and the variability of temperature around long-term historical warming. The models with ECS slightly above  simulate the above situations better than models with a lower climate sensitivity.

Many projects and groups exist to compare and to analyse the results of multiple models. For instance, the Coupled Model Intercomparison Project (CMIP) has been running since the 1990s.

In preparation for the 2021 IPCC Sixth Assessment Report, a new generation of climate models have been developed by scientific groups around the world. The average estimated climate sensitivity has increased in Coupled Model Intercomparison Project 
The cause of the increased ECS lies mainly in improved modelling of clouds. Temperature rises are now believed to cause sharper decreases in the number of low clouds, and fewer low clouds means more sunlight is absorbed by the planet and less reflected to space. Models with the highest ECS values, however, are not consistent with observed warming.

Notes

References

Further reading 

 
 .

External links 
 What is 'climate sensitivity'? Met Office
 How scientists estimate 'climate sensitivity' Carbon Brief

Climate change feedbacks
Paleoclimatology